Open Secret is a 1948 American film noir directed by John Reinhardt, starring John Ireland and Jane Randolph.

Plot
Newlyweds Paul Lester (Ireland) and his wife Nancy (Randolph) are invited to visit Paul's friend Ed Stevens. They arrive to find Stevens gone and a mysterious phone call gets Paul to the other end of town. While he's away, Nancy is assaulted by a would-be burglar. Paul thinks there's something more going on than a missing persons case or a burglary and tries to interest Police Detective Frontelli (Leonard) in looking into it, but Frontelli is initially skeptical. 

When Stevens turns up under the wheels of a truck along with evidence tying him to an earlier hit-and-run murder, Paul is certain that there's some kind of organized conspiracy afoot. What he finds is a town slowly coming under siege from a secret band of anti-Semitic thugs masquerading as a patriotic organization, with whom Stevens had been involved and tried to quit. Paul and Nancy's situation goes from bad to dangerous when they accidentally stumble upon evidence that could hang the murderers.

Cast
 John Ireland as Paul Lester 
 Jane Randolph as Nancy Lester 
 Roman Bohnen as Roy Locke 
 Sheldon Leonard as Sergeant Mike Frontelli 
 George Tyne as Harry Strauss 
 Morgan Farley as Larry Mitchell, also known as Phillips 
 Ellen Lowe as Mae Locke 
 Anne O'Neal as Mrs. Tristram 
 Arthur O'Connell as Carter 
 John Alvin as Ralph

Production notes
Some of the music cues from the original soundtrack by Herschel Burke Gilbert were re-used in Season One of the 1950s television series Adventures of Superman.

References

External links
 
 
 
 Original soundtrack of Herschel Burke Gilbert’s score from Open Secret

1948 films
1948 crime drama films
American crime drama films
American black-and-white films
Film noir
Eagle-Lion Films films
Films directed by John Reinhardt
Films scored by Herschel Burke Gilbert
1940s English-language films
1940s American films